In quantum physics, the squeeze operator for a single mode of the electromagnetic field is

where the operators inside the exponential are the ladder operators.  It is a unitary operator and therefore obeys , where  is the identity operator.

Its action on the annihilation and creation operators produces

The squeeze operator is ubiquitous in quantum optics and can operate on any state.  For example, when acting upon the vacuum, the squeezing operator produces the squeezed vacuum state.

The squeezing operator can also act on coherent states and produce squeezed coherent states. The squeezing operator does not commute with the displacement operator:

 

nor does it commute with the ladder operators, so one must pay close attention to how the operators are used. There is, however, a simple braiding relation, 
 

Application of both operators above on the vacuum produces squeezed coherent states:

.

Derivation of action on creation operator 
As mentioned above, the action of the squeeze operator  on the annihilation operator  can be written as  To derive this equality, let us define the (skew-Hermitian) operator , so that .

The left hand side of the equality is thus .
As can be readily verified, we haveUsing these equalities, we obtain 

 

so that finally we get

See also
 Squeezed coherent state

References

Quantum optics